Uxbridge High School is a mixed secondary school with academy status in west London in the town of Uxbridge.

Summary
Ofsted inspected the school on 28 February 2018 and graded the overall effectiveness of the school as good.

The school has close links with the RSC (Royal Shakespeare Company) and TeachFirst, being one of its first partner schools.

The current principal, Louisa Seymour, started in September 2022 after being promoted from Vice Principal. Prior to her, Nigel Clemens was principal who moved on after 36 years of service with the school. He was formerly Senior Vice Principal, who took over the post of Principal at short notice in May 2014 after Peter Lang had left.

History 
Since 1907, the current Greenway site was occupied by the Uxbridge County School, until it moved to the house in Royal Lane where it took its new name Bishopshalt Grammar School. The Greenway premises were subsequently occupied by the Uxbridge Senior Elementary School, later to become Greenway School. The original building, still remains on site as the 'Old Building' (pictured on the right)

In 1968–69, the school had a rebuild to add new classrooms, the current Science building.

In 1991, the school was renamed to its current name.

The school was one of the first few to partner with charity Teach First. To celebrate the charity's 10th anniversary, their patron Charles, Prince of Wales (current King) and Camilla, Duchess of Cornwall, visited the school on 22 February 2012. Students led a traditional Indian Dhol drum performance and an urban adaption of Romeo and Juliet, with the Prince attending a maths lesson and Duchess in a literary class. A plaque was also unveiled to commemorate the 10-year partnership between the school and the charity.

The Lancaster building was completed in May 2009, costing £6 million and housing a sixth form centre. It was named after Joseph Lancaster in recognition of his influence on education in the local area.

In 2013/14, the Dome, opened with Brentford FC, was built: a fully enclosed 60m by 50m pitch with Third Generation artificial turf. The building also has learning zones, changing rooms, a gym and a physio room.

In 2014, the school opened a new £2.5 million state of the art drama and music facility. The new Orsino building's name references the character of Orsino from Shakespeare's Twelfth Night.

In 2015, then-Mayor of London and MP for Uxbridge and South Ruislip Boris Johnson visited the school.

House System 
Uxbridge High School currently has five house groups:
  Brunel - Green
  Cambridge - Purple
  Imperial - Red
  Oxford - Silver
  Warwick - Blue

House groups are a method of pastoral care, with siblings being placed in the same house to ensure consistency in safeguarding. Each house has a dedicated Head of House and a non-teaching Guidance Leader to support the students full-time.

Before 2022, the house system was as follows:
  Lancaster - Green
  Stuart - Purple
  Tudor - Red
  Windsor - Silver
  York - Blue

Before 2010, the house system was as follows:
  Brunel - Yellow
  Cambridge - Blue
  Thames - Green
  Harvard - Red

Design History 
Up until 2011, the school used the following logo:
 

It rebranded in 2011 to the following:

In 2022, a change to the typeface and Navy colour was added:

Notable former students
 Jaden Philogene-Bidace, footballer

References

External links

Secondary schools in the London Borough of Hillingdon
Academies in the London Borough of Hillingdon